Vanilleae is an orchid tribe of 9 genera in the subfamily Vanilloideae.

Classification 
Tribe Vanilleae
Genus Clematepistephium (1 species) (Endemic to New Caledonia)
Clematepistephium smilacifolium

Genus Cyrtosia (5 species)
Cyrtosia integra
Cyrtosia javanica
Cyrtosia nana
Cyrtosia plurialata
Cyrtosia septentrionalis

Genus Epistephium (21 species)
See all...

Genus Eriaxis (1 species) (Endemic to New Caledonia)
Eriaxis rigida

Genus Erythrorchis (2 species)
Erythrorchis altissima
Erythrorchis cassythoides

Genus Galeola (6 species)
Galeola cathcarthii
Galeola faberi
Galeola falconeri
Galeola humblotii
Galeola lindleyana
Galeola nudifolia

Genus Lecanorchis (21 species) (Endemic to New Caledonia)
See all...

Genus Pseudovanilla (8 species)
Pseudovanilla affinis
Pseudovanilla anomala
Pseudovanilla foliata
Pseudovanilla gravilis
Pseudovanilla philippinensis
Pseudovanilla ponapensis
Pseudovanilla ternatensis
Pseudovanilla vanilloides
Genus Vanilla (110 species)
See all...

References

External links 

 
Vanilloideae tribes